Die Pariser Friedenskonferenz 1919 und die Friedensverträge 1919–1920. Literaturbericht und Bibliographie (The Paris Peace Conference of 1919 and the Peace Treaties of 1919–1920. Literature Review and Bibliography), is a book published in 1970 by the German librarian and historian Max Gunzenheuser; it is a special bibliography of the Paris Peace Conference that contains about 2300 sources published during the preceding 50 years.

References 

 Hans H. Kempe. Der Vertrag von Versailles: Der Inhalt : Deutsche Geschichte von 1918–1930. — Reinhard Welz Vermittler Verlag e.K., 2008. — P. 135. — 274 p. — .
 Walter Schwengler. Völkerrecht, Versailler Vertrag und Auslieferungsfrage: d. Strafverfolgung wegen Kriegsverbrechen als Problem d. Friedensschlusses 1919 / 20 von. — Stuttgart: Deutsche Verlags-Anstalt, 1982. — P. 15–19, 383. — 412 p. — (Beiträge zur Militär- und Kriegsgeschichte, Bd. 24). — .
 Gerd Hardach. The First World War, 1914–1918. — University of California Press, 1981. — P. 226, 241, 306. — 346 p. — .
 Gerhard Schreiber. Der Mittelmeerraum und Südosteuropa: von der "non belligeranza" Italiens bis zum Kriegseintritt der Vereinigten Staaten. — Deutsche Verlags-Anstalt, 1984. — P. 278, 710. — 774 p. — .
 Andreas Hillgruber. Review of Die Pariser Friedenskonferenz 1919 und die Friedensverträge 1919-1920. Literaturbericht und Bibliographie, Max Gunzenhäuser [de] // Historische Zeitschrift. — 1971. — Dezember (Bd. 213, H. 3). — S. 718–719. — ISSN 0018-2613.
 René Albrecht-Carrié. Max Gunzenhäuser: Die Pariser Friedenskonferenz 1919 // Erasmus: Speculum Scientarium. — 1973. — Vol. 25. — P. 185–186. — ISSN 0013-9955.
 Ostdeutscher Literatur-Anzeiger, Bd. 17, Dec. 1971, H. 5/6, S. 206.

1970 non-fiction books
German books
History books about World War I